The 2010–11 Etisalat Emirates Cup is the third season of the league cup competition for teams in the UAE Pro-League.

Group stage

Group A

Group B

Semi-finals

Final

Top goalscorers 
Last updated 2 May 2011

References

External links 
 The Official Page

UAE League Cup seasons
Etisalat Emirates Cup
2010–11 domestic association football cups